Sir Thomas Clere (died 14 April 1545) was a successful poet at the court of Henry VIII. He is commemorated in several poems by Henry Howard, Earl of Surrey, with whom he had a very close friendship. He was engaged to Mary Shelton, a former mistress of the King's, in 1545, but died before their love match could be made into a marriage.

Sir Thomas Clere was the third son of Sir Robert Clere (c.1493 - 10 August 1529) of Ormesby St. Margaret, Norfolk, and his wife Alice, the daughter of Sir William Boleyn and his wife Margaret Ormond (otherwise Butler), daughter and co-heiress of Thomas Butler, 7th Earl of Ormond. Alice was the sister of Thomas Boleyn, 1st Earl of Wiltshire, and the aunt of King Henry VIII's second Queen, Anne Boleyn. Sir Thomas Clere was thus Queen Anne Boleyn's first cousin.

Sir Thomas Clere was buried in the Church of St Mary at Lambeth in Surrey where his monumental brass can still be seen. His brother, Edward Clere was killed at the battle of Pinkie in 1547.

Footnotes

References

1545 deaths
16th-century English poets
16th-century Royal Navy personnel
English knights
Year of birth missing
English male poets
Burials at St Mary-at-Lambeth